David Brandt Berg (February 18, 1919 – October 1, 1994), also known as King David, Mo, Moses David, Father David, Dad, or Grandpa to followers, was the founder and leader of the cult most often known as the Children of God  and more recently known as known as The Family International. Berg's group, founded in 1968 among the counterculture youth in Southern California, gained notoriety for incorporating sexuality into its spiritual message and recruitment methods. Berg and his organization have subsequently been accused of a broad range of sexual misconduct, including child sexual abuse.

Life

Family heritage 
His maternal grandfather was Rev. John Lincoln Brandt (1860–1946), a Disciples of Christ minister, author, and lecturer of Muskogee, Oklahoma. Brandt had a dramatic conversion in his mid-twenties and immediately entered full-time Christian service. For years he was a Methodist circuit rider. He later became a leader of the Alexander Campbell movement of the Disciples of Christ, a restoration movement that developed into the current Protestant denomination Christian Church (Disciples of Christ).

Early years (1919–1969)
Berg was born on February 18, 1919, in Oakland, California. During his early years, he usually lived in or around Florida. He was also the youngest of three children born to Hjalmer Emmanuel Berg and Rev. Virginia Lee Brandt; both parents were Christian evangelists. His father was Swedish. Berg credited his mother for influencing him the most. Although raised in a Christian home, Virginia became an atheist during her college years. However, shortly after the birth of her first child, she broke her back in an accident and spent the next five years disabled and bedridden, often hovering near death. Eventually she recovered and spent the rest of her life with her husband, Hjalmer, in active Christian service as a pastor and evangelist. 

Virginia and Hjalmer were no strangers to controversy. They were expelled from the Disciples of Christ after publicly testifying of her "divine healing," which was contrary to church doctrine. They subsequently joined a new denomination, the Christian and Missionary Alliance, shortly before David Berg's birth. In later years, their missionary zeal and disdain for denominational politicking often set them at variance with the conservative faction of that church's hierarchy, causing them to work largely as independent pastors and evangelists.

David Berg spent his early years traveling with his parents, who pursued their evangelical mission with a passion. In 1924, they settled in Miami, Florida, after Virginia successfully led a series of large revivals at the Miami Gospel Tabernacle. This became Berg's home for the next 14 years, while his mother and father were pastors at a number of Miami churches. As is the case with many pastors and their dependents, the Berg family depended entirely on the generosity of their parishioners for their support, and often had difficulty making ends meet. This instilled in Berg a lifelong habit of frugality, which he encouraged his followers to adopt.

David Berg graduated from Monterey High School in 1935 and later attended Elliott School of Business Administration. Like his father, Berg became a minister in the Christian and Missionary Alliance in the late 1940s, and was placed at Valley Farms, Arizona. Berg was eventually expelled from the organization for differences in teachings and for alleged sexual misconduct with a church employee. In Berg's writings he claimed the expulsion was due to his support for greater racial diversity among his congregation.

Fred Jordan, Berg's friend and boss, allowed Berg and his personal family to open and run a branch of his Soul Clinic in Miami, Florida as a missionary training school. After running into trouble with local authorities over his aggressive disapproval of evolution being taught as fact in public schools, Berg moved his family to Fred Jordan's Texas Soul Clinic, in Western Texas.

The Children of God/The Family (1968–1994)
David Berg, along with his wife and children, founded the organization known as the Teens for Christ, operating out of Light Club coffeehouse in Huntington Beach, California, in 1968. While in California, after receiving strong resistance from local churches due to his followers picketing them, he took the whole group of 40–100 people "on the road." It was while they were camped in Louis and Clark Park that a news reporter first called them "The Children of God."

In the mid-1970s, Berg began preparing his followers for a "revelation" he had about "Flirty Fishing" or winning important, influential men through prostitution. 

In 1975, after letting everyone know via one of his letters that his mistress, Maria (Karen Zerby), gave birth to a so-called "Jesus baby" (as his cult called babies born within the cult), Berg changed the name to "The Family of Love" or "The Family." Eventually in 1991, this was changed to "The Family International."

Berg lived in seclusion, communicating with his followers and the public via nearly 3,000 "Mo Letters" ("Mo" from his pseudonym "Moses David") that he wrote on a wide variety of subjects. These typically covered spiritual or practical subjects and were used as a way of disseminating and introducing policy and religious doctrine to his followers. Berg's letters admonished the reader to "love the sinner but hate the sin." His writings were often extreme and uncompromising in their denunciation of what he believed to be evil, such as mainstream churches, pedophilia laws, capitalism, and Jews.

Death and legacy
Berg had been in hiding since 1971 and died in November 1994 in Portugal. He was buried in Costa de Caparica, and his remains were cremated. 

After his death in 1994, his wife Karen Zerby (also known as Maria Berg) led The Family, and there were 6,000 adults and 3,000 children as members of The Family worldwide, in 50 countries. There were investigations of The Family for child abuse and prostitution in Argentina, France, Spain, Australia, Venezuela, and Peru.

Controversy
David Berg has been accused of leading a group which promoted assaults on children and sexual abuse of women and children for decades. Former members have told their stories in widely disseminated media reports, though official inquiries at the time found no evidence of child abuse. Berg was also personally accused of pedophilia. He claimed in his letters he was taught to masturbate in church by another boy his age. He also claimed that when his mother caught him, he was forced to masturbate in front of his father. Oftentimes Berg would explicitly describe his sexual preferences and recalled that one thing he regretted was that he never slept with his mother.

In a child custody case in the United Kingdom Berg's granddaughter, Merry Berg, testified that Berg sexually molested her when she was a young teenager. Another of Berg's granddaughters, Joyanne Treadwell Berg, spoke on American television about her claim of being sexually abused by David Berg. Berg's adopted son, Ricky Rodriguez, wrote an article on the website MovingOn.org in which he describes Berg's sexual activity involving a number of women and children. Davida Kelley, the daughter of Rodriguez's nanny (Sarah Kelley), accused Berg of molesting her in a June 2005 Rolling Stone article. In the same article, a woman identified as Armendria alleged that David Berg sexually abused her when she was 13 years old. Despite numerous investigations and claims by purported witnesses and survivors, Berg was never charged with a crime related to child sexual abuse.

The allegations of Berg's institutionalization of pedophilia and sexual abuse were also described in Not Without My Sister, an autobiographical recount of the sexual abuse of three sisters who eventually escaped The Family. The book describes videos being taken of very young children engaging in sexually explicit activities for Berg's consumption, even as a method for his choosing of child brides. Serena Kelley claims to have been one of Berg's child brides and was purported to have been presented by her mother at age 3 to be selected.

His distant Jewish ancestry notwithstanding—in 1745, one of his mother's forebears, Jewish by birth but a Christian convert, moved to the American colonies and lived as a Mennonite—David Berg was outspokenly antisemitic, believing that the Jews were responsible for the death of Jesus, as well as all persecution of Christians in the world. In support of his views of an international Jewish conspiracy, he cited the forged Protocols of the Elders of Zion, but disclaimed the label "antisemitic."

Berg predicted several apocalyptic events that did not occur. His best-known prediction was that the comet Kohoutek (1974) would wreak havoc and possible destruction. This prediction was shared by others outside The Family, such as Joseph F. Goodavage in the January 1974 issue of SAGA magazine. He also predicted that the state of California would be subject to a massive earthquake in 1969, the Great Tribulation would begin in 1989, and the Second Coming of Jesus would happen in 1993.

Personal family
Berg married his first wife, Jane Miller (known as "Mother Eve" in the Children of God), on 22 July 1944 in Glendale, California. They had four children together: Linda (known as "Deborah" in the Children of God); Paul, d. April 1973 (known as "Aaron" in the Children of God); Jonathan Emanuel (known as "Hosea" in the Children of God); and Faith.

Berg married his second wife Karen Zerby (the present leader of The Family) in 1970.

Berg informally adopted Ricky Rodriguez, the son of his second wife Karen Zerby. In the 1970s and 1980s, sexually suggestive photographic depictions of Rodriguez ("Davidito") with adult caretakers were disseminated throughout the group by Berg and Zerby in a childrearing handbook known as The Story of Davidito. In January 2005, Ricky Rodriguez murdered one of the female caretakers shown in the handbook before taking his own life several hours later.

Media featuring Berg
 Children of God, Documentary, Directed by John Smithson, 1994.
Cult Killer, documentary on Ricky Rodriguez and child abuse within The Family International.
Sex Cult Nun: Breaking Away from the Children of God, a Wild, Radical Religious Cult, an autobiography written by Faith Jones Esq. (Granddaughter of David Berg, Daughter of Jonathan "Hosea") about her experience growing up in The Family and her subsequent escape at the age of 22.
Apocalypse Child: A Life in End Times, A Memoir, Flor Christine Edwards.

References

External links

 podcast

1919 births
1994 deaths
20th-century apocalypticists
American people of Swedish descent
Christian and Missionary Alliance
Cult leaders
Founders of new religious movements
Members of The Family International
The Family International